PLU can stand for:

Aviation
 Pierce County Airport, Washington, US, FAA LID
 Belo Horizonte/Pampulha – Carlos Drummond de Andrade Airport, IATA callsign

Organizations and people
 Pacific Lutheran University
 People Like Us (musician), Briton Vicki Bennett
 People Like Us (Singapore), gay equality lobby group in Singapore
 Phi Lambda Upsilon, honorary chemical society

Transport
 Plumstead railway station, London, National Rail station code

Other
 Price look-up code